The Luck of the Navy may refer to:

 The Luck of the Navy (play), a play by Mrs Clifford Mollison first staged in 1918
 The Luck of the Navy (film), a 1927 British silent film
 Luck of the Navy, a 1938 British film adaptation